Adam Fuller is an American football coach. He is currently the defensive coordinator at Florida State University. He was previously the assistant head coach, linebackers coach, and special teams coordinator at Marshall University in Huntington, West Virginia, prior to serving as defensive coordinator at the University of Memphis.

A graduate of the Sacred Heart University, Fuller was previously the head coach at Assumption College in Worcester, Massachusetts for one season in 2008.

Head coaching record

References

Year of birth missing (living people)
Living people
American football linebackers
Assumption Greyhounds football coaches
Chattanooga Mocs football coaches
Marshall Thundering Herd football coaches
Memphis Tigers football coaches 
Sacred Heart Pioneers football players
Wagner Seahawks football coaches
WPI Engineers football coaches